The Fakkham script ("Tamarind pod-script") or Thai Lanna script is a Brahmic script, used historically in the Lan Na Kingdom. The script was frequently used in Lan Na stone inscriptions.

Origin
The Fakkham script, was derived from the old Sukhothai script (also known as Proto-Thai script), and used extensively in Lan Na between the beginning of the 15th century and the end of the 16th century. The Fakkham script was possibly introduced to Lan Na by a religious mission from Sukhothai. The script was named after its similarity to the shape of tamarind pods, because the letters became elongated and somewhat more angular rather than square and perpendicular like its ancestor the Sukhothai script. Several letters had noticeable "tails" extending above and below the main writing line.

History
The Fakkham script was used extensively in the territories controlled by the kings of Chiang Mai, the Lan Na kingdom, between the beginning of the fifteenth and the end of the sixteenth centuries. It has been speculated that the Fakkham script was the official script of Lan Na and other northern kingdoms, since the script was used in diplomatic notes of the Lan Na kingdom sent to China. The Lan Na kingdom used the Fakkham script as their secular script used for official inscriptions, important letters and other documents, while the Tai Tham script was used for religious texts.

A number of ancient inscriptions in the script have been discovered in the Bo Kaeo, Luang Nam Tha and Sayabouri provinces of Laos. The Fakkham script can be found on various royal steles around Vientiane, dating from the beginning of the second quarter of the 16th century.

The Fakkham script can be considered the prototype for the Lao script. It has been suggested that the script is the source of the White, Black, and Red Tai writing systems found in eastern Yunnan, northern Laos, and Vietnam.

Characteristics
The Fakkham script has 41 consonants, 22 vowels, 10 numerals and 6 kinds of diacritics. Words are written by adding a final consonant, vowel, diacritic or all three, to an initial consonant.

References

External links

Brahmic scripts
Obsolete writing systems
Lan Na
Inscriptions of Thailand